Cape Discord, also known as Kangeq, is a headland in the North Atlantic Ocean, southeast Greenland, Kujalleq municipality.

History
Cape Discord was named in old maps before Lieutenant Wilhelm August Graah passed it in 1829 during his East Coast expedition. Graah took a latitude observation at the headland.

Geography
The entrance of Kangerluk Fjord is  NW and that of Kuutseq Fjord  SSW of the cape.

References

External links
 Seabirds and seals in Southeast Greenland

Discord